Sage City Symphony is a community orchestra based in Bennington, Vermont, United States, that tackles ambitious works from the traditional repertoire as well as commissioning new works. It was formed in 1972 by its first musical director, noted composer Louis Calabro, who was on the faculty of Bennington College. Sage City Symphony maintains its relationship with the college, relying on the campus for rehearsal and performance space.

The Symphony attracts amateur as well as professional musicians without the requirement of auditions, drawn from Vermont, Massachusetts and New York states. It presents four concerts a year, starting rehearsals in September for a performance featuring a major orchestral work in November. The Symphony restarts rehearsals after the New Year for three concerts presented February through May: a Chamber Concert, Youth Concert and a final Spring concert featuring a significant orchestral work.

The Symphony is led by musical director and conductor Michael Finckel. It is governed/supported by a working volunteer Board  which appoints a Manager and a Librarian. Like the players, board members come from surrounding areas of Vermont, Massachusetts and New York states. The Board contains a mix of orchestral players and longtime supporters from the business and academic community.

Performance information 
Performance dates and programs are announced on Sage City Symphony's web site. In addition they are reported in area media outlets.

These media outlets have included: Bennington Banner in Bennington, Vermont, North Adams Transcript in North Adams, Massachusetts, the Tri-State Pennysaver News in Bennington, Vermont, Eastwick Press in eastern Rensselaer County of New York, the Vermont News Guide, Vermont Public Radio (VPR), WAMC in Albany, New York, WMHT-FM in Schenectady, New York, and Catamount Access TV in Bennington, Vermont.

Performances are recorded by Catamount Access TV (CAT-TV) and aired subsequently. Most performances for the last several years have been recorded by Joel Patterson  of Mountaintop Studios and rendered onto CD or made available for file sharing.

Funding
The Symphony is a not for profit 501(c)(3), registered in the State of Vermont, and relies entirely on donations and grants. Grant sources have included the National Endowment for the Humanities, the Fund for North Bennington, the Vermont Arts Council and the Vermont Community Foundation. The Symphony enjoys steady support from individuals, local Foundations and business donors. The Symphony also solicits sponsors for concerts, which have included a range of enterprises such as the Bank of Bennington, the Vermont Country Store, Stewart's Shops and more.

Conductor
The Symphony is currently directed by Michael Finckel. Michael Finckel started his studies with his parents, cellist George Finckel and pianist Marianne ("Willie") Finckel. George Finckel  and Willie Finckel  were on faculty at Bennington College. Michael Finckel attended Oberlin College Conservatory and Bennington College where he studied composition, conducting and orchestration with Louis Calabro and Henry Brant.

He has taught cello and composition at Bennington and Marymount Colleges and at Princeton and Cornell Universities. As a member of the faculty of the Vermont Governor's Institute on the Arts  in the 1990s he taught composition to gifted junior and high school students throughout Vermont. He has a strong background in contemporary music, as well as the traditional repertoire. He has regularly collaborated with New York's leading new music ensembles and performed  under the direction of Leonard Bernstein and Pierre Boulez.

Michael Finckel performs and coaches each year at the Composer's Conference sponsored by the Chamber Music Center  of Wellesley College in Massachusetts, and at the Chamber Music Conference and Composer's Forum of the East  at Bennington College.

Community connections
Sage City Symphony has long had an annual Youth Concert featuring young soloists or performances with local youth groups. Past performances have included works with the Symphony and the Bennington Children's Chorus and the Green Mountain Youth Orchestra. This tradition goes back to the Symphony's founder, Louis Calabro, with works such as Child's Play for children's chorus and piano composed in 1990 and performed by the Symphony again in 2009.

The Symphony started a Young Composers Project in 2009. The Symphony pays a stipend to a mentor to help young people prepare works for orchestral performance, alternating each year between reaching out to area high school or college age students. The high schools from which students have been drawn for this project include the Hoosac School in Hoosick Falls, New York, the Mount Anthony Union High School (Miles Yucht, Alive ) in Bennington, the Long Trail School in Dorset, Vermont, Pittsfield High School in Pittsfield, Massachusetts, and the Mount Greylock Regional High School in Williamstown, Massachusetts. The college students have been primarily drawn from Bennington College.

One of the compositions by a high school student, Wind Blows, was placed on YouTube by its composer. One of the high school composers from the 2009 project, Patrick Madden, received the Daniel Pearl Berkshire Scholarship.

A recording of The Tinkerer, a piece from Sage City Symphony's March 2014 Youth Concert, has been made available on musescore.com by its composer, Zack Weishaus, along with an animated score.

Major works performed
Sage City Symphony has performed major works from the traditional repertoire including the following.
 Daphnis and Chloe, by Ravel 
 Symphony No. 1, by Mahler
 Petrushka, 1911 Version, by Stravinsky
 Symphonie Fantastique, by Berlioz
 Symphony in Three Movements by Igor Stravinsky
 Beethoven's Ninth Symphony, arr. by Henry Brant
 La Mer by Debussy 
 Symphony No. 9 in E Minor, From the New World by Antonín Dvořák
 Piano Concerto No 2, by Rachmaninoff, featuring Wu Han soloist
 Symphony No. 2 in E Minor, opus 27 by Sergei Rachmaninoff
 Symphony no. 4 in D minor, Op 120, by Schumann
 Symphony No. 4 by Shostakovich

Commissioned works
Sage City Symphony commissions a new work each year. These have included the following. Some of these composers including Zeke Hecker. Bruce Hobson, and Dennis Báthory-Kitsz have been founders and members of the Consortium of Vermont Composers, founded in 1988  and recognized in a Proclamation by Governor Shumlin making 2011 the Year of the Composer.

 Commissioned work XLIV in eight movements by Roland Gori  performed Sunday May 17, 2015
 Commissioned work Kora Saba: For Djembe and Chamber Orchestra, by Michael Wimberly, performed Sunday November 16, 2014
 Commissioned work Concerto for Cello and Orchestra, by Allen Shawn, premiered 1999 and performed again in May 2013, soloist Maxine Neuman
 Commissioned work Table of Toys and Numbers, by Nick Brooke 
 Commissioned work by John Eagle 
 Three for Orchestra and Hyperpiano by Randall Neal, premiere November 14, 2010 
 Concerto for Flute and Orchestra by Robert Singley premiere May 3, 2009
 Work for orchestra and percussion by Derrik Jordan, premiere spring 2008 
 Mountain Paths by Bruce Hobson, premiere May 28, 2000
 Commissioned work "Softening Cries" by Dennis Báthory-Kitsz premiere June 6, 1992 under the direction of T. L. Read
 Work by Susan Hurley, 1988–1990
 The Birthmark by Zeke Hecker premiere 1989
 Blood Memory: A Long Quiet After the Call  by Tina Davidson premiered June 1, 1986
 Symphony for Orchestra with Piano Obbligato by T.L. Read, premiere 1986 
 Missa Brevis for SATB chorus, strings (piano reduction for rehearsal), opus 72 (1983), by Louis Calabro written for the Bennington College Chorus Recorded 1984: Sage City Symphony
 Tundra by Michael Finckel
 Sonnet for Baritone and Orchestra, Text: John Keats, baritone Wayne Dalton, by Vivian Fine. Conducted by Louis Calabro. Premiere December 5, 1976.
 Concerto for Percussion Quartet and Orchestra by Marta Ptaszynska, work listed as premiered by Sage City Symphony under Louis Calabro on October 10, 1974

Chamber works performed in 2009-2010
 Symphony No. 13 in D Major by Joseph Haydn
 Serenade in D Minor, Opus 44 by Antonín Dvořák
 Horn Concerto No. 2 in E flat K 412 by Mozart, John Eagle  soloist
 Jupiter Symphony by Mozart
 Suite from Gesta Romanorum by Robert Zimmerman 
 Elegy for Cello and Orchestra, Opus 24 by Faure
 Grand Duo Concertante for Violin and Double Bass by Giovanni Bottesini, soloists Kaori Washiyama  and Robert Zimmerman double bass
 Five Greek Songs by Maurice Ravel, soprano soloist Kerry Ryer-Parke 
 Cantique de Jean Racine by Faure

References

American orchestras
Musical groups from Vermont
Performing arts in Vermont
Bennington, Vermont